Laverdines is a former commune in the Cher department in the Centre-Val de Loire region of France. On 1 January 2019, it was merged into the commune Baugy.

Geography
The river Vauvise flows north through the eastern part of the commune.

Population

Sights
A nineteenth-century chapel.
 The church of St. Sylvain, dating from the twelfth century.

See also
Communes of the Cher department

References

Former communes of Cher (department)
Populated places disestablished in 2019
Berry, France